Vernár is a village and large municipality in Poprad District in the Prešov Region of northern Slovakia. It lies between Low Tatras and Slovenský raj mountain ranges.

History
The village was mentioned in the historical records for the first time in 1295.

Geography
The municipality lies at an altitude of 765 metres and covers an area of 52.901 km². It has a population of about 600 people.

Economy and infrastructure
There is a football club, chess club and a ski-lift area in the village. Cultural sightseeings are a classical Greek Catholic church from the 19th century and a preserved folk architecture.

References

External links
http://vernar.e-obce.sk
http://www.vernar.sk/ (www.vernar.sk)

fix indexing